Orihon (Japanese: 折本, Hepburn: Orihon) is a book style originating from the Tang dynasty (A.D. 618-908) in China and was later developed in the Heian period (A.D. 794-1185) in Japan.

Construction 
Orihon consist of a long strip of paper with writing on one side that is then compacted by folding in zig-zag fashion. The orihon format is considered a step between a scroll and a codex.

The style of folding is similar to that of the air bellows of a concertina or accordion, such that every written page faces another written page when the book is closed. It may therefore be opened to any page. It may have a cover attached to the front and back end sections of the book. Diehl describes orihon as having stabbed holes in the back cover to allow the book to be "laced."

Often torinokogami paper was used in the making of orihon. Torinokogami is a kind of glossy Japanese paper that is derived from mulberry fibers.

History 
The development of orihon began in China but later took on an association with Japanese books, as shown by its current name. "The development of alternatives to the roll in China is difficult to date, but it appears that at some time during the Tang period long rolls consisting of sheets of paper pasted together began to be folded alternately one way and the other to produce an effect like a concertina. It has been supposed that this form was suggested by the palm-leaf books which transmitted Buddhist texts from India to China. However that may be, it is in any case a fact that the concertina form was primarily used in China, and subsequently in Japan, for Buddhist texts. Books of this format are called orihon 折本 in Japan, and the format survived until the nineteenth century and beyond for printed Buddhist sūtras and occasionally for other books, such as reference lists, calendars, and folding maps." Laura C. Liberman notes in an article that the accordion book style used in Tibet traces back to orihon origins.

Etymology 
The combination of characters are borrowed from Chinese, which originally translates the phrase to "a loss" or "a loss of money."  However, when looking at the individual characters, a different meaning is found. The Traditional Chinese characters are defined as 折 meaning "to break (e.g. stick or bone); a loss" and 本 meaning "roots or stems of plants; origin; source; this; the current; root; foundation; basis; classifier for books, periodicals, files etc originally," In this context, it means a breakdown of a book. In Japanese, it combines the roots "ori" (fold) and "hon" (book). Edith Diehl describes orihon as a general Asian style and translates it to "stabbed binding."

Uses 
Beginning in the twelfth century, one of the most popular books to appear in concertina format was the Tale of Genji.

Cyril James Humphries Davenport notes in his 1898 lecture that "writing upon a roll was found to be the most convenient at a very early date by the Chinese, Japanese and [K]oreans, they were also the first to find out that if the rolls were simply folded backwards and forwards between the 'pages' of writing or printing, the whole book became easier to read, and this form, known as 'Orihon,' is used in those countries to the present day."

Traditional orihon books are associated with Japanese Buddhist works and e-hon, or picture books. Modern applications are found in artistic modes, such as Tom Burtonwood's 2013 plastic rendering using a 3-D printer.

See also 
Folded leaflet#Concertina fold
Folding-book manuscript, a similar format found in Mainland Southeast Asia

List of Orihon works 
The Museum of Metropolitan Art in New York, New York hosts a collection of orihon art. Some of that work is available to view on their website. 
 Utagawa Hiroshige (Japanese, 1797-1858) Sakkyo Kageboshi Zukushi (Collection of Improvised Silhouette Plays) n.d.
 Onna Kasen, an 18th-century book written about famous Japanese female poets.
 中山聘使畧 (Chūzan heishi ryaku or Short account of the Ryūkyūan mission) This book explains the history and geography of Ryūkyū.
 Suzuki Harunobu (ca. 1724-70). A beauty watching a couple drinking sake, from The Spell of Amorous Love (Enshoku koi no urakata). Japan, circa 1766-70. Woodblock printed chuban orihon (folded illustrated book). 7.5 x 5.125 inches (19.2 x 13 cm). This piece is part of Asia Week New York's 2015 "gallery roster" for the "celebration for Asian Art" and is provided by Scholten Japanese Art from the United States as part of their exhibition Erotic Art of Japan: Everybody’s Doing It.

References 

Books by type